Crime mapping is used by analysts in law enforcement agencies to map, visualize, and analyze crime incident patterns.  It is a key component of crime analysis and the CompStat policing strategy.  Mapping crime, using Geographic Information Systems (GIS), allows crime analysts to identify crime hot spots, along with other trends and patterns.

Overview
Using GIS, crime analysts can overlay other datasets such as census demographics, locations of pawn shops, schools, etc., to better understand the underlying causes of crime and help law enforcement administrators to devise strategies to deal with the problem.  GIS is also useful for law enforcement operations, such as allocating police officers and dispatching to emergencies.

Underlying theories that help explain spatial behavior of criminals include environmental criminology, which was devised in the 1980s by Patricia and Paul Brantingham, routine activity theory, developed by Lawrence Cohen and Marcus Felson and originally published in 1979, and rational choice theory, developed by Ronald V. Clarke and Derek Cornish, originally published in 1986.  In recent years, crime mapping and analysis has incorporated spatial data analysis techniques that add statistical rigor and address inherent limitations of spatial data, including spatial autocorrelation and spatial heterogeneity.  Spatial data analysis helps one analyze crime data and better understand why and not just where crime is occurring.

Research into computer-based crime mapping started in 1986, when the National Institute of Justice (NIJ) funded a project in the Chicago Police Department to explore crime mapping as an adjunct to community policing. That project was carried out by the CPD in conjunction with the Chicago Alliance for Neighborhood Safety, the University of Illinois at Chicago, and Northwestern University, reported on in the book, Mapping Crime in Its Community Setting: Event Geography Analysis.  The success of this project prompted NIJ to initiate the Drug Market Analysis Program (with the appropriate acronym D-MAP) in five cities, and the techniques these efforts developed led to the spread of crime mapping throughout the US and elsewhere, including the New York City Police Department's CompStat.

Applications
Crime analysts use crime mapping and analysis to help law enforcement management (e.g. the police chief) to make better decisions, target resources, and formulate strategies, as well as for tactical analysis (e.g. crime forecasting, geographic profiling).  New York City does this through the CompStat approach, though that way of thinking deals more with the short term.  There are other, related approaches with terms including Information-led policing, Intelligence-led policing, Problem-oriented policing, and Community policing.  In some law enforcement agencies, crime analysts work in civilian positions, while in other agencies, crime analysts are sworn officers.

From a research and policy perspective, crime mapping is used to understand patterns of incarceration and recidivism, help target resources and programs, evaluate crime prevention or crime reduction programs (e.g. Project Safe Neighborhoods, Weed & Seed and as proposed in Fixing Broken Windows), and further understanding of causes of crime.

The boom of internet technologies, particularly web-based geographic information system (GIS) technologies, is opening new opportunities for use of crime mapping to support crime prevention. Research indicates that the functions provided in web-based crime mapping are less than in most traditional crime mapping software. In conclusion, existing works of web-based crime mapping focus on supporting community policing rather than analytical functions such as pattern analysis and prediction.

See also
 Crime analysis
 Geographic profiling

Programs and projects 
 CrimeView
 Criminal Reduction Utilising Statistical History
 CrimeAnalyst
 RAIDS Online
 RiskAhead
 ATACRAIDS

Individuals 
 André-Michel Guerry
 Michael Maltz

Public access 
 RAIDS Online
 SpotCrime.com
 Trulia, US real estate site with crime mapping
 YourMapper, open data crime mapping
 CitySafe, crime mapping for travelers & tourists

General 
 Public Participation GIS

References

Further reading 
 

 
Applications of geographic information systems
Criminology
Human geography
Law enforcement techniques
Crime statistics
Map types